Bémont may refer to:

 Le Bémont - municipality in the district of Franches-Montagnes in the canton of Jura in Switzerland.
 Russy-Bémont -  French commune in the Oise department in northern France

People 

 Charles Bémont - French scholar, born in Paris